Motor is an Australian automobile magazine published monthly by Are Media. Motor is Australia's leading performance car publication, with two major awards for automotive manufacturers: Performance Car of the Year and Sports Car of the Year.

History and profile
Motor magazine was originally published as Modern Motor from its inaugural issue on 9 May 1954 by the Colin Ryrie as MD of Modern Magazines and Jules Feldman as editor. The name derived from the publishing house that produced it, Modern Magazines. Colloquially, the title was abbreviated to Motor, and subsequently the word 'Modern' was dropped from the title to become simply Motor in 1992. The magazine is headquartered in Melbourne.

Dylan Campbell was the editor between 2013 and 2020. After switching to Wheels in September 2020, Campbell was succeeded as editor by Andy Enright.

As of 2020 Motor is being published by Are Media, the successor to the Bauer Media Australia.

It was announced in April 2022 that the June 2022 issue of Motor will be the magazine's last, ending sixty-eight years of continuous publication.

Bang For Your Bucks
Bang For Your Bucks was an annual award recognising Australia's best value new performance or sports vehicle. It was inaugurated in 1994.

The winner is determined by combining performance data, as gathered on a racetrack, with price to produce a Bang For Your Bucks score.

In 2022, Bang For Your Bucks was replaced by a new competition, Sports Car of the Year, run alongside the existing Performance Car of the Year. The inaugural winner of Sports Car of the Year 2022 was the Subaru BRZ.

Performance Car of the Year
Motor's first Performance Car of the Year was in 1996. Performance Car of the Year recognises the best new performance or sports vehicle released in the preceding 12 months, based on the votes of a judging panel.

References

Are Media
Automobile magazines published in Australia
Magazines established in 1954
Magazines disestablished in 2022
Magazines published in Sydney
Monthly magazines published in Australia
1954 establishments in Australia
2022 disestablishments in Australia